Nice to Meet You may refer to:

 "Nice to Meet Ya" (Niall Horan song), 2019
 "Nice to Meet Ya" (Meghan Trainor song), featuring Nicki Minaj, 2020
 "Nice to Meet Ya", a 2021 song by Wes Nelson featuring Yxng Bane

See also
 Nice to Meet You (disambiguation)